Geekalli Hundi is a small village near Nanjangud in Mysore district, Karnataka, India.

Location
Geekalli Hundi is located on the Tirumakudal Narsipur road from Nanjangud at a distance of 4.7 kilometers.

Industrial Pollution
Many residents of the village suffer from skin diseases due to industrial pollution.

Education
The village has a new highschool called Samudhra Public School. This school has classes from first grade to the ninth grade. The teachers are Kanmani, Kumuda, Apoorva, Lakshmi, Roopa, Sunitha, Raghu, Shanthu, Manjunatha, Bhartesh, Suchithra, Akkamahadevamma, Pradeeksha, Sowbhagya, Prakruthi, Bharath and Mamatha.

Image Gallery

References

Villages in Mysore district